Shah Jikrul Ahmad (16 November 1951 – 7 May 2022) was a Jatiyo Samajtantrik Dal politician and served as a Jatiya Sangsad member representing  the Brahmanbaria-5 constituency.

Career
Ahmad was elected to parliament from Brahmanbaria-5 as a JSD (Inu) candidate in 2008.

References

1951 births
2022 deaths
People from Brahmanbaria district
9th Jatiya Sangsad members
Jatiya Samajtantrik Dal politicians
Place of birth missing